But Beautiful is an album of pop standards by Boz Scaggs, released in 2003. It reached number one on the Billboard Top Jazz Albums chart in 2004.

Reception

Allmusic found the album "an entirely pleasant listen" and praised the jazz quartet backing Scaggs, but rated the album as poor, citing Scaggs' "sometimes too casual" phrasing and criticizing his approach as predictable rather than fresh; on the other hand, it reached #1 on the Billboard Top Jazz Albums chart, and was a "critical and commercial triumph".

Track listing 
 "What's New?" (Bob Haggart, Johnny Burke) – 4:30
 "Never Let Me Go" (Ray Evans, Jay Livingston) – 5:06
 "How Long Has This Been Going On?" (George Gershwin, Ira Gershwin) – 6:07
 "Sophisticated Lady" (Duke Ellington, Irving Mills, Mitchell Parish) – 5:14
 "But Beautiful" (Jimmy Van Heusen, Johnny Burke) – 5:36
 "Bewitched, Bothered and Bewildered" (Richard Rodgers, Lorenz Hart) – 3:29
 "Easy Living" (Ralph Rainger, Leo Robin) – 4:13
 "I Should Care" (Axel Stordahl, Paul Weston, Sammy Cahn) – 5:25
 "You Don't Know What Love Is" (Gene de Paul, Don Raye) – 5:46
 "For All We Know" (J. Fred Coots, Sam M. Lewis) – 5:30
Bonus Track Japanese Release:
 "My Funny Valentine" (Rodgers, Hart)

Personnel 
 Boz Scaggs – vocals
 Paul Nagel – piano, arrangements
 John Shifflett – bass
 Jason Lewis – drums
 Eric Crystal – saxophone

Production
 Jeff Cressman – engineer
 Steve MacMillan – engineer
 Joel Moss – mixing
 Bernie Grundman – mastering at Bernie Grundman Mastering (Hollywood, California).
 Phillip Andelman – photography
 David Bullen – design

Chart positions

References

External links
 But Beautiful Lyrics

Boz Scaggs albums
2003 albums
Traditional pop albums
Albums produced by Boz Scaggs